m-Cymene is an organic compound classified as an aromatic hydrocarbon. Its structure consists of a benzene ring meta-substituted with a methyl group and an isopropyl group. It is a flammable colorless liquid which is nearly insoluble in water but soluble in organic solvents.

Isomers and production 
In addition to m-cymene, there are two other geometric isomers called o-cymene, in which the alkyl groups are ortho-substituted, and p-cymene, in which they are para-substituted. p-Cymene is the most common and only natural isomer. The three isomers form the group of cymenes.

Cymenes can be produced by alkylation of toluene with propylene.

References

Alkylbenzenes
C4-Benzenes